Caterina Amigoni Castellini was an Italian pastellist living in Spain.

Castellini was the daughter of Venetian painter Jacopo Amigoni; after his 1738 marriage to mezzo-soprano Maria Antonia Marchesini, he was appointed court painter in Madrid, moving there in 1747. In 1773 Richard Twiss, on a visit to the city, encountered the painter's two daughters, Signora Castellini and Signora Belluomini. Twiss claimed that both women were talented in both vocal and instrumental music, and said of Castellini that she "paints portraits in Crayons extremely well". The reference was picked up by Thomas Dodd, who erroneously dubbed the artist "Charlotte", the name of her aunt Carlotta Amigoni, also an artist. Caterina may have been related by marriage to Teresa Castellini, subject of a well-known portrait by her father, but this is not certain.

References

Italian women painters
Pastel artists
18th-century Italian painters
18th-century Italian women artists
Italian expatriates in Spain